Publicis Healthcare Communications Group (PHCG) is a healthcare communications network that comprises nearly 12 agency brands in more than 60 offices located in 10 countries. Its agencies include global brands Saatchi & Saatchi Wellness, Digitas Health LifeBrands, Discovery, Publicis Life Brands, Publicis Health Media, Publicis Touchpoint Solutions,  and in-sync Strategy, as well as regional brands. In 2011, 2012, 2013 and 2014, Advertising Age ranked PHCG as the largest U.S. healthcare communications network by revenue.   A division of Publicis Groupe S.A., PHCG agencies offer clients advertising, medical education, sales and marketing, digital, market access, and medical and scientific affairs. They have more than 5,500 employees worldwide.

Overview
PHCG was established in 2003, and was the first healthcare-specific network in communications.  Global clients include Pfizer, Sanofi, AstraZeneca, Merck, Procter & Gamble,  Boehringer Ingelheim and Roche.

In October 2011, it was announced Publicis Groupe agencies Digitas Health and Razorfish Health would become part of the PHCG network.  Digitas Health and Razorfish Health will operate as stand-alone brands, run by co-Presidents Michael du Toit and Alexandra von Plato.

In January 2013, PHCG announced the creation of Publicis Health Media. Matt McNally was named President of PHM  and will lead the business unit for PHCG.

In October 2013, Publicis Groupe announced that Heartbeat Ideas and Heartbeat West will join the PHCG network as a Saatchi & Saatchi Health entity. The current New York based Saatchi & Saatchi group - comprising Saatchi & Saatchi Wellness and Saatchi & Saatchi Health Communications - will merge, and be known as Saatchi & Saatchi Wellness. Heartbeat and its sister agency will now operate under "Heartbeat Ideas, a member of Saatchi & Saatchi Wellness," and "Heartbeat West, a member of Saatchi & Saatchi Wellness."

PHCG Global Leadership
 Alexandra von Plato, President and CEO
 Kathy Delaney, Global Chief Creative Officer, PHCG, Saatchi & Saatchi Wellness, Razorfish Healthware, and Discovery USA 
 Alexandra von Plato, Group President, North America, PHCG, Digitas Health LifeBrands, Publicis Life Brands, and Heartbeat Ideas
 Michelle Keefe, President, Publicis Touchpoint Solutions
 Rick Keefer, Global Chief Business Development Officer, PHCG
 Ashley Kuchel, Group President, EU/APAC, PHCG
 Nathalie Le Bos, Chief Financial Officer, PHCG
 Andrea Palmer, President, Publicis Health Media
 Marjan Panah, Chief Human Resource Officer, PHCG
 Janet Winkler, President, PHCG

References

External links 
PHCG Website

Communications consultants
Publicis Groupe